The Melbourne Garrick Club was an association of people with interests in the theatre, founded in 1855, and disbanded around 1866 after the death of one of its "leading lights".

History 
The Club, whose aims were "the cultivation of dramatic literature and art, and the occasional production of dramatic representations in aid of charitable and other purposes", was founded with around 50 members, including: 
President: Richard Hengist Horne, the poet and critic, "Orion"
Vice-president James Smith of The Argus
Secretary: Dr James Edward Neild
Treasurer: James Coates
Other members included:
Sir William A'Beckett (Chief Justice)
William M. Akhurst, journalist and writer of burlesques
S. H. Banks
W. B. Baxter
Alfred Bliss, auctioneer of Bliss & Joy
Charles Edward Bright
G. V. Brooke
H. A. Bruce
John Buckley Castieau of Beechworth
J. H. Deorwyn (c. 1623 – 6 August 1888), actor
John Edwards jun. (born 1836 in Launceston), barrister, "the Collingwood chicken"
R. Henningham
W. J. Henningham
W. B. Hickling
G. J. Hough
George H. R. Ireland
William Levev
Archibald Michie journalist and politician
Thomas Pavey, solicitor
G. H. Rogers, actor, comedian
Dr Clement Sconce
James Smith
Henry Gyles Turner
Theodore W. Whipham
W. H. Williams
William John Wilson, theatrical scene painter
Richard Younge, stage manager
The club was formed at "Williams' dining rooms" in Elizabeth Street; later meetings were held at the Kelly's Argus Hotel, adjacent The Argus newspaper offices.
It went into recess around 1866. One of its last activities was a concert to raise money for a memorial to the great actor G. V. Brooke.

Notes and references 

1855 establishments in Australia
1866 disestablishments in Australia
Performing arts in Melbourne
Amateur theatre companies in Australia